The 2nd Luftwaffe Field Division was an infantry division of the Luftwaffe branch of the Wehrmacht that fought in World War II. It was formed using surplus Luftwaffe ground crew and served on the Eastern Front from late 1942 to October 1943, when it was destroyed and disbanded.

Operational history

The 2nd Luftwaffe Field Division was one of several Luftwaffe divisions formed in 1942 from surplus ground crew and intended to serve as conventional infantry divisions. The 2nd was raised at Groß Born in September 1942, under the command of Colonel Hellmuth Petzold.

The division was sent in November 1942 to the central sector of the Eastern Front, where it helped repel Soviet attacks in the area around Smolensk. 

After the establishment of the II Luftwaffe Field Corps, the division became subordinated to this Corps and was relocated to the Nevel area. The division had the task of securing the connection between Army Groups North and Center. On 6 October 1943, the division was struck by an intense Soviet offensive aimed at the connection between Army Group North and Center. 
On the first day of the battle, the division's positions were overrun and a gap with a width of 12 km was created in the frontline. The connection to the neighboring 83rd Infantry Division was lost and the division retreated in panic. Its losses were extraordinarily high, especially in material. The division was therefore dissolved on 15  October 1943, with effect from 1 November 1943.

Commanders
Oberst Hellmuth Petzold (Sep 1942 - 1 Jan 1943)
Oberst Carl Becker (1 Jan 1943 - 17 Jan 1943)
Oberst Hellmuth Petzold (18 Jan 1943 - 1 Nov 1943)

Sources
 
 

02
1942 establishments in Germany
1943 disestablishments in Germany
Military units and formations established in 1942
Military units and formations disestablished in 1943